George Hilliard (1827 – May 23, 1892) was a Canadian businessman and politician from the province of Ontario.

Born in Morrisburg, Upper Canada, the son of Christopher Hilliard, a British officer, and Catherine Meyer, Hilliard came to Peterborough County in 1847. He began working as a clerk in Peterborough in 1847. He opened his own general store with his brother and later managed a lumber business. In 1862, he purchased a saw mill and afterwards a large stone flouring mill. He was elected to the House of Commons of Canada for the electoral district of Peterborough West in the 1878 election. A Liberal-Conservative, he was re-elected in the 1882 election.

References
 
 

1827 births
1892 deaths
Conservative Party of Canada (1867–1942) MPs
Members of the House of Commons of Canada from Ontario